The Union for Relief''''  (Union pour la Relève (UPR)'') is a political party of Benin. In the parliamentary election held on 31 March 2007, the party won three out of 83 seats.

References

Political parties in Benin
Political parties with year of establishment missing